Muladi may refer to:

Muladí, a native Iberian Muslim in al-Andalus
Muladi (politician) (1943-2020), Indonesian academic